Francesco Gonzaga (6 December 1538 – 6 January 1566) was an Italian nobleman, who was Duke of Ariano.  He was also a Roman Catholic cardinal and bishop.

Biography
Francesco Gonzaga was born in Palermo on 6 December 1538, the son of Ferrante Gonzaga (a member of the House of Gonzaga) and Isabella di Capua.   His father was at that time viceroy of Palermo.  He was the nephew of Cardinal Ercole Gonzaga.  His brother Giovanni Vincenzo Gonzaga also became a cardinal.

When Ferrante died in 1557 Ercole Gonzaga became guardian and the young Mantuan humanist and future Jesuit Antonio Possevino became tutor to the brothers.  He studied law as a young man.  In 1538, he was made archpriest of Guastalla.  On 26 February 1560 he became a protonotary apostolic.

Pope Pius IV made him a cardinal deacon in the consistory of 26 February 1561.  He received the red hat and the deaconry of San Nicola in Carcere on 10 March 1561.  The pope named him papal legate in the Campagne and Maritime Province.

On 2 March 1562 he was elected Archbishop of Cosenza with dispensation for not having reached the canonical age; he was named administrator of the see.

On 16 July 1562 he opted for San Lorenzo in Lucina, a titular church declared to be a deaconry pro illa vice.  He opted for the order of cardinal priests on 1 March 1564 and San Lorenzo in Lucina was returned to its status as a titular church at that time.  He resigned the government of the Archdiocese of Cosenza sometime before 12 January 1565.  On 5 May 1565 he was elected Bishop of Mantua with dispensation for not having reached the canonical age.

He participated in the papal conclave of 1565-66 that elected Pope Pius V.  He died during the conclave, in Rome, on 6 January 1566. He was buried in San Lorenzo in Lucina.

References

1538 births
1566 deaths
Nobility from Palermo
Francesco
16th-century Italian cardinals
Apostolic pronotaries
16th-century Italian nobility
Bishops of Mantua
Clergy from Palermo
16th-century Italian Roman Catholic bishops